Mikhail Bakunin's Confession is an 1851 autobiographical work written by the imprisoned anarchist for clemency from Russian Emperor Nicholas I.

Background and contents 

Mikhail Bakunin (1814–1876) was the leading anarchist revolutionary of the 19th century, active from the 1840s through the 1870s. In the 1840s, he moved from philosophical studies to revolutionary agitation. After participating in the 1848 Prague and 1849 Dresden uprisings, he was imprisoned, tried, sentenced to death, and extradited multiple times. Placed in solitary confinement in the Peter and Paul Fortress of St. Petersberg, Russia, in 1851, Bakunin wrote his Confession at the direction of Russian Emperor Nicholas I.

The Confession accounts for Bakunin's political activities throughout the 1840s, from his original departure from Russia to Berlin in 1840 through his arrest in 1849. The work is neither a capitulation nor an act of defiance, but a combination. Bakunin told Alexander Herzen it was a combination of fancy and truth.

Publication 

Nicholas I read the Confession carefully, marking the text with marginalia and sharing it with his son, the tsarevitch, Alexander II as "very interesting and instructive". The work was held but not forgotten in the political police's archives for seventy years. The government later circulated extracts from the Confession to embarrass and discredit Bakunin.

Its full publication in 1921 was controversial, as some read Bakunin as genuflecting for clemency while others defended his criticism of Russian bureaucracy and silence about co-conspirators. Originally written in Russian, the Confession has since been published in Czech, French, German, Italian, and Polish, and only received its first English-language publication in its 1977 translation by Robert C. Howes, published by Cornell University Press along with the emperor's annotations.

Legacy 

Historian of anarchism Paul Avrich wrote of the importance of Bakunin's Confession as both a psychological and historial document, showing the roots of Bakunin's pan-Slavicism, antipathy for parliamentary government, plans for a revolutionary society, and mental state as a prisoner. Avrich said the Confession is among Bakunin's most interesting writings highlighting both his personality and an insider's account of the revolutionary 1840s. Avrich added that the author's tone of contrition was a "necessary expedient if he was ever to regain his freedom".

Max Nettlau and Vera Figner both wrote responses to the Confession.

References

Bibliography 

 
 
 
 
 
 
 
 
 
 https://books.google.com/books?id=2ob3KKRKt7wC&pg=PA236

External links 

 

1851 works
Autobiographies
Russian-language books